Domibacillus robiginosus is a bacterium from the genus of Domibacillus which has been isolated from a pharmaceutical clean room in Germany.

References

External links 

Type strain of Domibacillus robiginosus at BacDive -  the Bacterial Diversity Metadatabase

Bacillaceae
Bacteria described in 2013